Green Lake is one of two tiny crater lakes on Raoul Island in the Kermadec Islands, the other being Blue Lake. It covers an area of about 0.15 km2. It erupted on 17 March 2006, killing Department of Conservation worker Mark Kearney, who was measuring the lake's temperature.

See also 
 Raoul Island: 2006 eruption

Landforms of the Kermadec Islands
Lakes of the New Zealand outlying islands
Volcanic crater lakes
Raoul Island